Kevan James Hurst (born 27 August 1985) is an English professional footballer who plays as a midfielder. Currently Joint Manager of Belper Town Tornadoes Under 8's.

Career
Hurst was born in Chesterfield, Derbyshire. A versatile player, he can play all across the midfield or forward line though his preferred position is left-wing. He made his first senior appearance in the League Cup against Queens Park Rangers on 23 September 2003 with his only league appearance for the Blades coming on 25 September 2004 as a 90th-minute substitute for Tommy Black against Coventry City.

Since then, Hurst has been on loan to Boston United (where he scored his first career goal against Yeovil Town), Stockport County (where he scored once against Oldham Athletic) and Chesterfield. In July 2006, he returned to his home town team on six-month loan deal which ended on 2 January 2007.

After playing for United in the Third Round FA Cup defeat against Swansea City, Hurst was loaned out to Scunthorpe United on 31 January 2007 until the end of the season. He became a permanent signing for Scunthorpe at the end of the season, in a £200,000 deal.

On 18 August 2009, Hurst signed for League One side Carlisle United for a fee of around £100,000 up front which could rise to £145,000. He scored his first goal on his debut against former side Stockport County on 19 August.

On 28 January 2011, he signed on loan for the rest of the season with League Two side Morecambe. He made his Morecambe debut in the 1–1 draw away at Accrington Stanley on 1 February 2011.

Hurst was released by Carlisle United in May 2011. On 28 June 2011, Hurst signed for Walsall.
Hurst was released by Walsall on 9 May 2012.

Hurst agreed personal terms with Southend United and became their first signing of the summer, signing on a 2-year deal. In his first season with the Shrimpers, he was a key player, appearing at Wembley in the Football League Trophy final and starting over 50 times in all competitions, scoring 6 goals, including particularly memorable ones against Brentford and Rotherham. Indeed, at one point in the season, he held the distinction of having the most assists out of any League player. He finished the season with the highest number of set-ups in League Two. On 28 February 2014, Hurst signed a new two-year contract. Hurst was released by Southend when his contract came to an end at the conclusion of the 2015–16 season, a season where Hurst managed just 11 starts.

Following his release by Southend, Hurst joined Mansfield Town in June 2016. He scored the winner on his debut in a 3–2 win over Newport County on 6 August 2016. He was released by Mansfield at the end of the 2016–17 season.

Career statistics

Honours
Southend United
Football League Trophy runner-up: 2013

References

External links

1985 births
Living people
Footballers from Chesterfield
English footballers
Association football midfielders
Sheffield United F.C. players
Boston United F.C. players
Stockport County F.C. players
Chesterfield F.C. players
Scunthorpe United F.C. players
Carlisle United F.C. players
Morecambe F.C. players
Walsall F.C. players
Southend United F.C. players
Mansfield Town F.C. players
English Football League players